Delivery reliability is one of the five attributes in supply-chain management according to SCOR-model, developed by the management consulting firm PRTM, now part of PricewaterhouseCoopers LLP (PwC) and endorsed by the Supply-Chain Council (SCC) as the cross-industry de facto standard diagnostic tool for supply chain management, SCOR measures the supplier’s ability to predictably complete processes as promised. It is measured by perfect order fulfillment and demonstrates the degree to which a supplier is able to serve its customers within the promised delivery time.

Following the nomenclature of the DR-DP-Matrix, three main approaches to measure DR can be distinguished:
 (=CLIP)

Type of measurement: volume (V)/singular(S)
Type of view: on time (T)/ delivery (D)

Volume/on time (=CLIP)

Formula
If
 = 

Note: In the case that supplier notifies the appropriate partner in the supply chain that a promised delivery date/quantity cannot be met which is called delivery early warning (DEW), the sum of DEW issued to reduce the commit for a certain week is added in the denominator.

Else
NULL

Demand: Suppliers confirmed quantity;   c: Product identifier;  p: Time period e.g. a day, a week, a month ...

The cumulation over a period and a group of product identifiers c is done as follows:

whereas p is determined by demand period

Singular/delivery and singular/on Time

Singular case definition
To fit to the needs of the environment, the granularity of a singular case has to be defined. In general a singular case is described by an n-Tuple consisting of a set of the following order and delivery details:
 order number
 customer identifier
 product identifier
 wish date of customer
 confirmed date of supplier
 ship to information
 delivery date
 delivery note number

Formula

1)  
After a singular case has been delivered to the customer its DR is measured as follows:
If (wish date <= arrival date <= confirmed date of supplier) then
 DRsingular case=1
else
 DRsingular case=0

arrival date = delivery date + transit time

By cumulating the results of singular cases over a certain period p and, if necessary, additional criteria c (e.g. customer, product, ...) the delivery reliability is calculated as follows:

whereas p is determined by the arrival date

2)  
After a period has elapsed all singular cases with first confirmed date within period are considered and their DR is measured as follows:
If (wish date <= arrival date <= confirmed date of supplier) then
 DRsingular case=1
else
 DRsingular case=0

arrival date = delivery date + transit time

By cumulating the results of singular cases over a certain period p and, if necessary, additional criteria c (e.g. customer, product, ...) the delivery reliability is calculated as follows:

whereas p is determined by the first confirmed date

Result

0%≤≤100%

See also

Delivery performance

External links
 Supply-Chain Council website

Supply chain management